After is the second studio album by American musician Lady Lamb. It was released in March 2015 under Mom + Pop Music.

Track listing

Personnel

Main musicians
 Aly Spaltro – vocals, guitar, bass, banjo, organ, omnichord, synth, keys, percussion
 Marco Buccelli – drums, percussion

Production
 Nadim Issa – engineer, mixing, producer
 Aly Spaltro – producer, artwork, layout
 Joe LaPorta – mastering
 Shervin Lainez – photography
 David Shetterly – typography

Additional musicians
 Jacob Augustine – backing vocals (track 3)
 Gabriel Birnbaum – bari sax (tracks 3, 6)
 Dup Crosson – backing vocals (track 3)
 Nick Grinder – trombone (tracks 3, 6, 10, 12)
 Emily Holden – violin (tracks 6, 12)
 Nadim Issa – organ (tracks 2, 3, 9), vibraphone (tracks 3, 6), piano (track 6), synth (track 7), tenori (track 7), backing vocals (track 7)
 Cole Kamen-Green – trumpet (tracks 3, 6, 10, 12)
 TJ Metcalfe – backing vocals (track 3)
 Emily Hope Price – cello (tracks 6, 8, 12), backing vocals (track 7)
 Andrew Schuyler – handclap (track 9)
 Elizabeth Taillon – backing vocals (track 3)

References

External links

2015 albums
Lady Lamb albums
Mom + Pop Music albums